The Grand Prix de la Région Wallonne (French for Grand Prix of the Walloon region) was a cyclo-cross race held annually since its creation in 1998.

For many years it was held at Dottignies, Belgium. Its November 2014 edition was the first to be held at the Circuit de Spa-Francorchamps, better known for motor racing. This edition also saw it become part of the Superprestige competition series, marking the first time that the Superprestige has been held in Wallonia. The race was organized the last time in November 2016 and was then discontinued.

References

Cyclo-cross races
Cycle races in Belgium
Recurring sporting events established in 1998
1998 establishments in Belgium
Cyclo-cross Superprestige
Circuit de Spa-Francorchamps
Sport in Mouscron